Iqbal Naseer is a Pakistani politician who is currently serving as a member of the Gilgit-Baltistan Council since 12 November 2021. He belongs to Pakistan Muslim League (N) (PML-N).

References

Living people
Pakistan Muslim League (N) politicians
Members of the Gilgit-Baltistan Council
Year of birth missing (living people)
People from Diamer District